The Urupá River is a river of Rondônia state in western Brazil. It is a left tributary of the Ji-Paraná River.

Its source is in the Pacaás Novos National Park.

See also
List of rivers of Rondônia

References
Brazilian Ministry of Transport

Rivers of Rondônia